K. africanus may refer to:
 Kenyapithecus africanus, a synonym for Proconsul nyanzae, an extinct primate species
 Kluyveromyces africanus, a fungus species in the genus Kluyveromyces

See also
 Africanus (disambiguation)